Drowning Pool may refer to:

Drowning Pool, a rock band
Drowning Pool, one of their albums
The Drowning Pool, a novel by Ross Macdonald
The Drowning Pool, a film starring Paul Newman and directed by Stuart Rosenberg based on the novel

See also 
 Drowning pit